Liantang station or Liantang railway station may refer to:
Liantang station (Guangzhou Metro) (莲塘站)
Liantang station (Shenzhen Metro) (莲塘站)
 , station on Beijing–Kowloon railway
Liantang railway station (Shanghai) (练塘站), future station on Shanghai–Suzhou–Huzhou high-speed railway